Hnanisho II (born c.715) was patriarch of the Church of the East between 773 and 780.  His name, sometimes spelled Ananjesu or Khnanishu, means 'mercy of Jesus'.

Sources 
Brief accounts of Hnanisho's patriarchate are given in the Ecclesiastical Chronicle of the Jacobite writer Bar Hebraeus (floruit 1280) and in the ecclesiastical histories of the Nestorian writers Mari (twelfth-century), Amr (fourteenth-century) and Sliba (fourteenth-century).

Hnanisho's patriarchate 
The following account of Hnanisho's patriarchate is given by Bar Hebraeus, who was more interested in his influential sponsor Isa the pharmacist than in the patriarch himself:

The catholicus Yaqob died after fulfilling his office for nineteen years, and was succeeded by Hnanisho II, bishop of Daquqa [Lashom].  He was consecrated at Seleucia on the recommendation of Isa the pharmacist, and died after fulfilling his office for four years.  It is said of this Isa the pharmacist that one day while he was sitting in his shop a woman arrived from the caliph's court with a bottle containing a urine sample.  Thinking that he was a doctor, she showed it to him and asked him whether he could diagnose the illness suffered by the urine's owner.  Isa, who had no knowledge or experience of the physician’s art, studied the urine and said, purely by way of a guess and with downcast eyes, 'This is not the water of a sick man, but belongs to a woman who carries a male child in her womb who will one day rule this kingdom.'  Now this woman was the maidservant of Kaizaran, the concubine of the caliph al-Mahdi, and she immediately ran to her mistress and told her what she had just heard.  Her mistress replied, 'Run back to that man and tell him that if his prophecy comes true, I will take him into my service and shower wealth upon him.'  And so Isa spent all his time in churches and monasteries, in the company of holy men and miracle-workers, and in fasting and praying, until his prediction came true.  He was then received with great honour in the caliph's court.

Hnanisho and the Nestorian mission to China 
Hnanisho is named in both Syriac and Chinese in a conventional dating formula at the end of the main inscription on the Nestorian Stele erected in Chang'an by the metropolitan Adam of Beth Sinaye in February 781.  The Syriac text reads 'In the days of the father of fathers the catholicus-patriarch Mar Hnanisho (b'yawmi aba d'abahatha Mar Hnanisho qatoliqa patrirqis)'.  The Chinese text reads 'when the monk Ning-Shu was governing the brilliant congregations of the East'（時法主僧寧恕知東方之㬌衆也）.  The news of Hnanisho's death several months earlier had evidently not yet reached the Nestorians of Chang'an.

See also
 List of patriarchs of the Church of the East
 Nestorian Stele

Notes

References
 Abbeloos, J. B., and Lamy, T. J., Bar Hebraeus, Chronicon Ecclesiasticum (3 vols, Paris, 1877)
 Assemani, J. A., De Catholicis seu Patriarchis Chaldaeorum et Nestorianorum (Rome, 1775)
 Brooks, E. W., Eliae Metropolitae Nisibeni Opus Chronologicum (Rome, 1910)
 
 Gismondi, H., Maris, Amri, et Salibae: De Patriarchis Nestorianorum Commentaria I: Amri et Salibae Textus (Rome, 1896)
 Gismondi, H., Maris, Amri, et Salibae: De Patriarchis Nestorianorum Commentaria II: Maris textus arabicus et versio Latina (Rome, 1899)

External links 

8th-century bishops of the Church of the East
8th-century deaths
Patriarchs of the Church of the East
Nestorians in the Abbasid Caliphate
Year of birth unknown
8th-century people from the Abbasid Caliphate
8th-century archbishops